Fabrice Richard (born August 16, 1973) is a French former professional footballer who played as a defender.

External links
 
 Fabrice Richard profile at chamoisfc79.fr

1973 births
Living people
French footballers
Association football defenders
Chamois Niortais F.C. players
FC Martigues players
AC Ajaccio players
Colchester United F.C. players
Red Star F.C. players
Olympique Alès players
Ligue 2 players
English Football League players
French expatriate footballers
Expatriate footballers in England